Mariner of the Seas is one of five s of Royal Caribbean International and can accommodate 4,252 passengers.

Mariner of the Seas is a second generation Voyager-class vessel.

The ship's godmother is American paralympic athlete Jean Driscoll.

Description
The ship has a diesel-electric powertrain using three Azipod azimuth thrusters.

Mariner of the Seas has 1,674 passenger cabins.

Service history
In early 2018, after a month long refit costing US$120 million which included adding additional cabins, the ship's gross tonnage was increased to 139,863 from 138,279.

In 2018, Mariner of the Seas operated cruises from Port Canaveral, Florida to the Bahamas visiting Nassau and Coco Cay. To facilitate re-positioning to Miami, Florida the ship performed three cruises. Firstly from Singapore to Dubai, then Dubai to Barcelona via the Suez Canal and the final leg sailed from Barcelona to Miami.

COVID-19 pandemic

During the coronavirus pandemic, the Miami Herald reported that, after cruises were cancelled worldwide and they had disembarked all passengers, Royal Caribbean Cruises had refused the CDC rules to repatriate many of their crew members due to the associated costs, with many crew members turning to desperate measures, such as hunger strikes, as a result.  On 10 May 2020, a male Chinese crew member of Mariner of the Seas was found dead aboard the ship.

Notes

References

External links

 Official website

Ships of Royal Caribbean International
Ships built in Turku
2003 ships